St John the Baptist Wearing the Red Tabard of the Order of St John is an oil on canvas painting by Italian painter Mattia Preti, from 1671. The painting has the dimensions of 98 x 78 centimeters. It is in the collection of MUŻA in Valletta, Malta.

Analysis
The painting is believed to be a self-portrait of the artist, Mattia Preti, wearing the red tabard of the Order of Saint John.

References

Sources

1671 paintings
Paintings in Malta
Paintings by Mattia Preti
Baroque paintings
Paintings depicting John the Baptist
Knights Hospitaller